Bergamo railway station serves the city and comune of Bergamo, in the region of Lombardy, northern Italy. Opened in 1854, it is located at the junction of lines to Brescia, Lecco, Seregno and Treviglio.

The station is currently managed by Rete Ferroviaria Italiana (RFI). However, the commercial area of the passenger building is managed by Centostazioni. Each of these companies is a subsidiary of Ferrovie dello Stato (FS), Italy's state-owned rail company.

The train services are operated by Trenord and Trenitalia.

Location
Bergamo railway station is situated at Piazza Guglielmo Marconi, at the south eastern edge of the city centre.

History
According to the Central Statistical Office of the FS, the station was opened on 22 April 1854, upon the inauguration of the whole of the Bergamo–Brescia railway.  However, another source says that the Bergamo–Brescia railway was opened only in stages.  According to that source, the Coccaglio-Brescia and Brescia-Verona sections both become operational on 22 April 1854 and were formally opened two days later, while the connection to Bergamo was not completed until 12 October 1857.

Features
The passenger building is connected with the seven through tracks and two platform docks of the station yard by a small pedestrian underpass, which also connects the station with Via Gavazzeni, near a school campus.

The underpass was finally opened in autumn 2008, almost fifty years after it was first proposed.

Train services
The station has about 10.3 million passenger movements each year.

The station is served by the following service(s):

 Express services (Treno regionale) Milan – Pioltello – Verdello – Bergamo
 Regional services (Treno regionale) Milan – Monza – Carnate – Bergamo
 Regional services (Treno regionale) Lecco – Calolziocorte – Bergamo
 Regional services (Treno regionale) Bergamo – Rovato – Brescia
 Regional services (Treno regionale) Treviglio – Verdello – Bergamo
 Regional services (Treno regionale) Bergamo – Brescia – Cremona – Fidenza – Massa – Pisa (1x per day)

{{rail line
|previous=Verdello-Dalmine<small>toward Milan Central
|next=Terminus|route=TrenordRE2
|col=
}}

Interchange
The station is connected with the urban transport network by line 1 of the ATB, which links the Old Town with Bergamo's Orio al Serio Airport. Not far away is the bus station, with bus lines to almost all municipalities in the Province, and the terminus of the Bergamo–Albino light rail.

Gallery

See also

 History of rail transport in Italy
 List of railway stations in Lombardy
 Rail transport in Italy
 Railway stations in Italy

References

External linksThis article is based upon a translation of the Italian language version as at January 2011.''

Railway Station
Railway stations in Lombardy
Railway stations opened in 1854
1854 establishments in the Austrian Empire
Transport in Bergamo